Mordellistena kirghizica is a beetle in the genus Mordellistena of the family Mordellidae. It was described in 2003 by Odnosum.

References

kirghizica
Beetles described in 2003